Below are the rosters for the UNCAF Nations Cup 2005 tournament in Guatemala, from February 19 to 27, 2005.

Group A

Head coach:  Anthony Adderly

Head coach:  Ramón Maradiaga

Head coach:  José de la Paz Herrera

Head coach:  Marcelo Zuleta

Group B

Head coach:  Jorge Luis Pinto

Head coach:  Carlos Cavagnaro

Head coach:  José Hernández

References
RSSSF Archive

Copa Centroamericana squads
squads